Babul Ki Duwayen Leti Jaa is an Indian soap opera produced by Shobhana Desai, and aired on Zee TV channel from 2000 to 2001. The story is based on the lives' of 7 girls and their dreams to accomplish something big in their lives'.

Cast
 Moonmoon Banerjee as Sheetal
 Kishwer Merchant as Malvika
 Tasneem Sheikh as Naina
 Narayani Shastri as Jenny
 Shweta Agarwal as Preeti
Chandni Toor replaced Agarwal as Preeti
 Kainaaz Pervez as Renu
 Ami Trivedi as Mona: Sheetal's sister
 Ravi Khanvilkar as Sheetal Father
 Arun Bali as Malvika's father
 Nandita Thakur as Malvika Mother
 Ajit Vachani as Naina's father
 Charusheela Sable as Naina's mother
 Vandana Gupte as Naina's step-mother
 Sudhir Dalvi as Preeti's maternal uncle
 Sulabha Deshpande as Preeti's maternal Aunty
 Mohan Bhandari as Renu's father
 Zarina Wahab as Professor Nafisa Siddiqui: Mona's professor
 Firoz Ali as Dr. Aditya Sheetal's fiance

References

Zee TV original programming
Indian television soap operas
2001 Indian television series debuts
Zee Zindagi original programming